Anjan Bandyopadhyay or Anjan Banerjee (24 August 1965 – 16 May 2021) was an Indian Bengali journalist who worked for various news and media channels such as Anandabazar Patrika, ETV Bangla, Akash Bangla, Zee 24 Ghanta, TV9 Bangla. He was the younger brother of Alapan Bandyopadhyay, the Chief Secretary of West Bengal.

Early life and education 
Anjan Bandyopadhyay completed his bachelor's and master's degree in Bengali literature from Presidency College, Kolkata. He passed secondary exam from Ramakrishna Mission Vidyalaya, Narendrapur in 1981. He had a journalistic career spanning over 33 years. In the beginning of the career he worked for news media and channels like Anandabazar Patrika, ETV Bangla, Akash Bangla & Zee 24 Ghanta etc. In 2015 he resigned from Zee 24 Ghanta and joined Anandabazar Patrika (Digital). He rejoined the Zee 24 Ghanta in November 2020. Before rejoining Zee 24 Ghanta, he was also associated with TV9 Bangla as its first editor.

Death 
Anjan Bandyopadhyay was admitted to the hospital due to COVID-19 in April 2021. He recovered and was discharged after a few days. In mid-May, his health deteriorated again and was hospitalized for the second time with fever. On 16 May 2021, he died in a private hospital in Kolkata. He's survived by his mother, wife, and daughter.

References

External links 

 

1965 births
2021 deaths
Deaths from the COVID-19 pandemic in India
Journalists from West Bengal
Presidency University, Kolkata alumni
Indian male journalists